The Forward on Climate rally was held at the National Mall in Washington, D.C. on February 17, 2013. The goal of the demonstration was to spur President Barack Obama and Congress to take more action to address global warming. Opposition to the proposed expansion of the Keystone XL Pipeline, that was still pending at the time, was a particular focus of the rally.

The event featured a range of speakers, including indigenous leaders, youth activists, and political figures such as Senator Sheldon Whitehouse and Van Jones, who emphasized the need for action to address climate change and called for the rejection of the Keystone XL pipeline.

Among the speakers were Sierra Club Director Michael Brune, U.S. Senator Sheldon Whitehouse, actress and activist Rosario Dawson, 350.org founder Bill McKibben, and Obama's former Special Advisor for Green Jobs Van Jones. Participants marched from the National Mall to the White House. Attendance was estimated at 35,000 (estimates ranged from 10,000 by a police officer to 50,000 by 350.org), and was thought to have been the largest climate rally in American history.

The rally was arranged by the Sierra Club, the Hip Hop Caucus, 350.org, and other organizations.

Reception
Patrick Michaels of the Cato Institute said that if the Keystone XL pipeline were constructed, people would be employed to maintain it. He dismissed fears over the project, saying 

 

He praised hydrofracturing for making a greater supply of natural gas available, and urged less governmental involvement in the energy sector.

In his State of the Union address the following week, President Obama said

 

The utterance was mentioned in several news stories about the rally.

See also
 List of protest marches on Washington, D.C.

External links
 Photos of February 17, 2013 Forward on Climate Rally and March

References

2013 protests
February 2013 events in the United States
Protest marches in Washington, D.C.
2013 in Washington, D.C.
Environmental protests in the United States